Cocoa Touch is the application development environment for building software programs to run on iOS for the iPhone and iPod Touch, iPadOS for the iPad, watchOS for the Apple Watch, and tvOS for the Apple TV, from Apple Inc.

Cocoa Touch provides an abstraction layer of iOS, the operating system for the iPhone, iPod Touch, and iPad. Cocoa Touch is based on the macOS Cocoa API toolset and, like it, is primarily written in the Objective-C language. Cocoa Touch allows the use of hardware and features that are not found in macOS computers and are thus unique to the iOS range of devices. Just like Cocoa, Cocoa Touch follows a Model–View–Controller (MVC) software architecture.

Cocoa Touch contains a different set of graphical control elements from Cocoa. Tools for developing applications based on Cocoa Touch are included in the iOS SDK.

Cocoa Touch in relation to other layers
iOS, watchOS, and tvOS technologies can be seen as a set of layers, with Cocoa Touch at the highest level and the Core OS/kernel at the bottom.

A hierarchical view of the iOS, watchOS, and tvOS technologies can be shown as follows:
 Cocoa Touch
 Media / Application Services
 Core Services
 Core OS / iOS kernel

Main features
Some of the main features and technologies of Cocoa Touch are:

 App Extension
 Data Management
 Handoff
 Document Picker
 AirDrop
 TextKit
 UIKit Dynamics
 Multitasking
 Auto Layout
 Storyboards
 UI State Preservation
 Apple Push Notification Service
 Local Notifications
 Gesture Recognisers
 Standard System View Controllers

Main frameworks
Cocoa Touch provides the key frameworks for developing applications on devices running iOS. Some of these key frameworks are:

Foundation Kit
UIKit (based on Application Kit)
GameKit
iAd (discontinued in 2016)
MapKit
 Address Book UI
 EventKit UI
 Message UI
 Notification Center 
 PushKit 
 Twitter

Ports
Microsoft's WinObjC, the GNUstep-based iOS bridge for the Universal Windows Platform, contains a working implementation of Cocoa Touch frameworks like Foundation, UIKit, and MapKit released under the MIT License. One of the UIKit implementations is based on XAML.

Various efforts have tried to bring UIKit, the modified AppKit from Cocoa Touch, to macOS:
 Chameleon is a port of UIKit to macOS from 2014.
 ZeeZide's UXKit is a more recent port of UIKit to macOS. It exists a layer above AppKit and UIKit.
 Apple used a "UXKit" private framework for a 2015 version of Photos.app.
 Apple made the bridge more official with the "iosMac" or "Marzipan" project in 2018, which put an "iOSSupport" directory full of iOS frameworks in macOS Mojave. They were originally restricted from developer use and was finally made official with the release of Mac Catalyst in 2019.

References

Gesture recognition
IOS
IPhone
Proprietary software